Dan Masterson (February 22, 1934 – August 12, 2022) was an American poet; he was  born in Buffalo, New York.

Biography 
Dan Masterson was born to Stephen and Kathleen Masterson in 1934, during the Great Depression, the youngest of three children. He attended St. Paul's Parochial School in the Buffalo suburb of Kenmore, and graduated from Kenmore High School in 1952; Masterson was the president of his graduating class.

Masterson studied at Canisius College and graduated from Syracuse University in 1956, in what later became the S. I. Newhouse School of Public Communications. After college, he worked as a disc jockey in Buffalo on WBNY, hosting Mystic Midnight, a jazz show, from midnight to 3 a.m.  After serving in the Signal Corps, he was hired on to promote traveling Broadway plays and musicals, while his wife worked as a Madison Avenue copywriter. They moved to Rockland County where Dan became a substitute high school teacher, then a full-time teacher, before joining the English faculty at Rockland Community College, where he has remained since the mid-sixties. He and Janet divide their time between their home in Pearl River and their cabin in the high-peak region of the Adirondacks.

Literary career 

Dan Masterson's first book, On Earth As It Is, was published in 1978, by The University of Illinois Press. In 1986, Masterson was elected to membership in Pen International in recognition of his first two volumes of verse: On Earth As It Is and Those Who Trespass. He's been a manuscript judge for The Associated Writing Programs' national manuscript competition, and a contributing editor to the annual PUSHCART PRIZE ANTHOLOGY. He has also been the recipient of two writing fellowships from The State University of New York, and was the first Writer-in-Residence at The Chautauqua Writers Center. In 2006, Syracuse University's Bird Library assumed stewardship of "The Dan Masterson Papers" for its Special Collections Research Center.

Teaching 
A recipient of the SUNY Chancellor's Award for Excellence in Teaching, Masterson has taught at Rockland Community College (RCC), State University of New York, since the mid sixties.  During eighteen of those years, he also served as an adjunct full professor at Westchester County's Manhattanville College, directing the poetry and screenwriting programs.  Upon his retirement from Manhattanville, the college's Board of Trustees established The Dan Masterson Prize in Screenwriting.

Works

Poetry collections
On Earth As It Is  - University of Illinois Press 1978
Those who Trespass  - University of Arkansas Press 1985
World Without End  - University of Arkansas Press 1991
All Things, Seen and Unseen  - University of Arkansas Press 1997

Awards 
Poetry Northwest Bullis Prize
The Borestone Mountain Poetry Award
Pushcart Prize 1978
Pushcart Prize 1988
The CCLM Fels Award
Rockland County (NY) Poet Laureate 2009-2011
Rockland County (NY) Poet Laureate 2011-2013

References

1934 births
Living people
Writers from Buffalo, New York
American male poets
Manhattanville College faculty